NGC 6251 is an active supergiant elliptical radio galaxy in the constellation Ursa Minor, and is more than 340 million light-years away from Earth. The galaxy has a Seyfert 2 active galactic nucleus, and is one of the most extreme examples of a Seyfert galaxy. This galaxy may be associated with gamma-ray source 3EG J1621+8203, which has high-energy gamma-ray emission. It is also noted for its one-sided radio jet—one of the brightest known—discovered in 1977.

References

External links
 
 www.jb.man.ac.uk/atlas/
 Wikisky image of NGC 6251
 Hubble Finds a Bare Black Hole Pouring Out Light (Probing the heart of the active galaxy NGC 6251—September 10, 1997)

Seyfert galaxies
Radio galaxies
Ursa Minor (constellation)
Elliptical galaxies
6251
10501
58472